Paschal Russell (born 1948) is an Irish former hurler who played as a midfielder and as a forward for the Clare senior team.

Russell made his debut for the team during the 1969 championship and was a semi-regular member of the starting fifteen until his retirement after the 1982 championship. Clare hurling was at a low ebb for much of Russell's career, and he ended his career without any honours at senior level.

At club level Russell is a four-time county club championship medalist with Clarecastle.

References

1948 births
Living people
Clarecastle hurlers
Clare inter-county hurlers